Windhorse may refer to:

Wind Horse, an allegory for the human soul in the shamanistic tradition of East Asia and Central Asia.
Windhorse (film)